Cove Creek Bridge may refer to:

Cove Creek Bridge (Corley, Arkansas), listed on the NRHP in Arkansas
Cove Creek Bridge (Martinville, Arkansas), listed on the NRHP in Arkansas
Cove Creek Tributary Bridge, Corley, Arkansas, listed on the NRHP in Arkansas